Sofia Tillström (born 15 May 1976) is a former professional tennis player from Sweden. She competed during her career as Sofia Finér.

Finér played on the professional tour in the 1990s, reaching a best singles ranking of 289 in the world, with two ITF titles. As a doubles player she had a top ranking of 254 and won three doubles titles on the ITF circuit.

In 1997 she featured as a doubles player in three Fed Cup ties. Partnering Annica Lindstedt, the pair won two of their three matches together for Sweden.

Now known as Sofia Tillström, she is a coach at the Ekerö Tennisklubb in the Stockholm region. Her husband is former ATP Tour player Mikael Tillström.

ITF finals

Singles (2–3)

Doubles (3–6)

See also
List of Sweden Fed Cup team representatives

References

External links
 
 
 

1976 births
Living people
Swedish female tennis players
20th-century Swedish women
21st-century Swedish women